Schwägalp Pass (el. ) is a high mountain pass in the Alps between the cantons of St. Gallen and Appenzell Ausserrhoden in Switzerland.

It connects Nesslau-Neu St. Johann in Toggenburg in St. Gallen and Urnäsch in Appenzell Ausserrhoden. It is named after the Schwägalp peak (el. ) on the north face of Säntis (el. ), which is the starting point of the aerial tramway to the top of Säntis. It was built in 1935.

The pass road has a maximum grade of 12 percent (12%).

See also

 List of highest paved roads in Europe
 List of mountain passes
List of the highest Swiss passes

Mountain passes of Appenzell Ausserrhoden
Mountain passes of Switzerland
Mountain passes of the Alps
Mountain passes of the canton of St. Gallen
Appenzell Ausserrhoden–St. Gallen border